Hickman is an unincorporated community in Caroline County, Maryland. It straddles the border with Kent County, Delaware, along Maryland Route 16.

The American Discovery Trail runs through the village.

See also
Hickman, Delaware

References

Unincorporated communities in Caroline County, Maryland
Unincorporated communities in Maryland